Christmas in the Aire is the third Christmas album and twenty-first studio album released by American musical group Mannheim Steamroller. The album was originally released in 1995, and was the biggest-selling holiday album in the United States that year with sales of 1,844,000 according to Nielsen/SoundScan.

"Christmas Lullaby" was the only track from this album included in the group's 2004 compilation Christmas Celebration. The song was re-recorded in lyrical form for the 2007 album Christmas Song with vocals by Olivia Newton-John.

On December 15, 1997, Christmas in the Aire was certified Quadruple Platinum by the Recording Industry Association of America for shipment of four million copies in the United States.

As of November 2014, Christmas in the Aire is the fifth best-selling Christmas/holiday album in the U.S. during the Nielsen SoundScan era of music sales tracking (March 1991 – present), having sold 3,740,000 copies according to SoundScan.

Track listing

References 

1995 Christmas albums
Mannheim Steamroller albums
American Gramaphone albums
American Gramaphone Christmas albums
Christmas albums by American artists
Classical Christmas albums
New-age Christmas albums